Jerry Ippoliti (born c. 1935) is a former American football player, coach, and college athletics administrator.  He served as the head football coach at the Northern Illinois University from 1971 until 1975, compiling a record of 25–29–1.  Ippoliti was the commissioner of the Mid-American Conference from 1994 to 1999.

Head coaching record

References

1930s births
Living people
American football ends
Buffalo Bulls football coaches
Miami RedHawks football players
Mid-American Conference commissioners
Northern Illinois Huskies football coaches
High school football coaches in Ohio